Moment redistribution refers to the behavior of statically indeterminate structures that are not completely elastic, but have some reserve plastic capacity.  When one location first yields, further application of load to the structure causes the bending moment to redistribute differently from what a purely elastic analysis would suggest.

When the load is applied to a beam, the beam has the property to resist it. When the beam is indeterminate, it forms sufficient number of hinges to make itself determinate. Hence in this process, few hinges are formed earlier and the rest are formed afterwards. Further increment in load does not increase the moment at the points where the plastic hinges are formed. The increased load increases the moment in the less stressed sections of the beam; hence due to this, further plastic hinges are formed. This  process of shift of application of moment in the beam is termed as moment redistribution in a beam.

References

Structural engineering